This is a list of Cypriot football transfers for the 2012–13 summer transfer window by club. Only transfers of clubs in the Cypriot First Division and Cypriot Second Division are included.

The summer transfer window opened on 1 June 2012, although a few transfers took place prior to that date. The window closed at midnight on 31 August 2012. Players without a club may join one at any time, either during or in between transfer windows.

Laiki Bank League

AEK Larnaca

In:

Out:

AEL Limassol

In:

Out:

AEP Paphos

In:

 
 

Out:

Alki Larnaca

In:

Out:

Anorthosis

In:

Out:

APOEL

In:

Out:

Apollon Limassol

In:

 

Out:

Ayia Napa

In:

Out:

Doxa Katokopias

In:

 

Out:

Enosis Neon Paralimni

In:

Out:

Ethnikos Achna

In:

Out:

Nea Salamina

In:

 

Out:

Olympiakos Nicosia

In:

Out:

Omonia

In:

Out:

Cypriot Second Division

AEK Kouklia

In:

Out:

AEZ Zakakiou

In:

Out:

Akritas Chloraka

In:

Out:

Anagennisi Dherynia

In:

Out:

APEP Pitsilia

In:

Out:

Aris Limassol

In:

Out:

Chalkanoras Idaliou

In:

Out:

Ermis Aradippou

In:

Out:

Ethnikos Assia

In:

Out:

Nikos & Sokratis Erimis

In:

Out:

Omonia Aradippou

In:

Out:

Onisilos Sotira

In:

 

 

Out:

Othellos Athienou

In:

Out:

PAEEK FC

In:

Out:

See also
 List of Bulgarian football transfers summer 2012
 List of Dutch football transfers summer 2012
 List of English football transfers summer 2012
 List of Maltese football transfers summer 2012
 List of German football transfers summer 2012
 List of Greek football transfers summer 2012
 List of Portuguese football transfers summer 2012
 List of Spanish football transfers summer 2012
 List of Latvian football transfers summer 2012
 List of Serbian football transfers summer 2012

References

Cypriot
Transfers
Cypriot football transfers